The Squamish Nation, Sḵwx̱wú7mesh Úxwumixw in Sḵwx̱wú7mesh Sníchim (Squamish language), is an Indian Act government originally imposed on the Squamish (Sḵwx̱wú7mesh) by the Federal Government of Canada in the late 19th century. The Squamish are Indigenous to British Columbia, Canada. Their band government comprises 8 elected councillors, serving four-year terms, with an elected band manager. Their main reserves are near the town of Squamish, British Columbia and around the mouths of the Capilano River, Mosquito Creek, and Seymour River on the north shore of Burrard Inlet in North Vancouver, British Columbia.

History

The 'Squamish Nation' is an amalgamation of different villages, which became reserves under the Indian Act which the Canadian government imposed on the Squamish people. The origin of the Squamish Nation dates back to the late 19th century, when missionaries and Canadian government officials created a puppet government under the Indian Act within the Squamish, with the goal of blocking access to resources and cultural geography. The main goal of the Indian Act was the eventual assimilation of the indigenous people into the settlers' colonial socio-political structures and lifestyle.

The Canadian government created a system of governing the Squamish (and other indigenous peoples) through selected "chiefs". These "chiefs" were selected based on factors such as their compliance, professed religious affiliation and sobriety. After passing of the Indian Act, these chiefs became the Indian Act government. The Squamish people were categorized and placed into numerous small reserves, established by the settler government. Each reserve was originally in the ownership of specific Squamish families. As land was being acquired, partitioned and allocated by the Federal Government without sufficient consent or consultation with the Squamish people, the separate villages formed into one Squamish Nation.

On July 23, 1923, a political amalgamation agreement was signed by 16 chiefs. This amalgamation signage became the nation known as the Squamish, and each chief had a seat at the council table. After decades, the hereditary system for the band council changed into an elected council, for which elections occurred every four years. The number 16 reflected onto the 16 signatures on the original amalgamation agreement.

Presently, the council is made up of eight members, with one serving as chairperson.

Prior to British Columbia's hosting of the 2010 Olympic Games, the Squamish Nation engaged in negotiations with the Provincial Government of British Columbia and Lil'wat First Nation. Numerous agreements were signed prior to and following the announcement of the host city for the Games, regarding issues such as Squamish land to be used for hosting the Games. Issues regarding the leasing of land, Nation-owned or operated businesses and other ventures currently account for much of the Squamish Nation's band council government business. The Squamish Nation recently announced the purchase of a Tree Farm License (License 38), which covers the Elaho Valley near Squamish, British Columbia. This is one of the rare instances of an Indigenous Nation buying forfeited land, as no agreement was ever signed between the Crown and the Squamish during colonization of the Lower Mainland. The Nation has been criticized as doing little for its people despite its economic growth.

The Squamish Nation has close ties with the Burrard Band or Tsleil-Waututh First Nation, who reside further east on Burrard Inlet. They have family connections to the Musqueam who reside on the southern edge of the city of Vancouver.

Squamish communities were seriously affected by the 2005 CN Rail Cheakamus River derailment.  About 40,000 litres of caustic soda were accidentally released into the Cheakamus, killing 500,000 fish. Squamish communities around the river were advised by the Vancouver Coastal Health Authority not to consume water from local wells, or local wildlife who use the river. The Squamish Nation Band Council is now taking legal action against CN Rail.

Government
The elected councillors make up the executive political body of this government. They operate on a four-year term with elections occurring around in December. They also elect a band manager. The most recent Council was elected September 26, 2021.

 Stewart "Sempúlyan" Gonzales
 Shayla "Sumkwaht" Jacobs (North Shore)
 Dustin "Khelsilem" Rivers (chairperson)
 Kristen "Tiyáltelut" Rivers (Regional)
 Ann "Syexwáliya" Whonnock
 Joyce Williams (Squamish Valley)
 Wilson "Sxwíxwtn" Williams
 Richard "Xwélxwelacha" Williams

The elected Band Manager is Bianca "Tsiyaliya" Cameron.

Treaty reserves

Existing reserves 
Indian reserves under the administration of the Squamish Nation are:

Treaty negotiations 
The Squamish Nation is currently in stage 3 of the BC Treaty Process but negotiations have not proceeded further in recent years.

Economic and resource development 
The Squamish Nation owns land in the Lower Mainland in areas that have some of the highest real estate values in the province. Some of these lands and properties are leased out with rents returning to the Squamish Nation. Additional revenues are earned through businesses owned by the Squamish Nation, such as marinas, a driving range and a gas bar. In a recently concluded business arrangement, digital billboards were erected on Squamish Nation lands in North Vancouver, West Vancouver, Vancouver and Squamish, including at the approaches to Vancouver's Burrard Street Bridge, Lions Gate Bridge and Ironworkers Memorial Second Narrows Crossing. That contract has been projected to bring approximately $60 million in revenue to the Squamish Nation over three decades.

The Squamish Nation also recently completed an agreement that will see a large gaming facility built on the highway leading into Squamish.

The Squamish Nation, the Lil’wat Nation, Bell Canada and the Province of BC joined in the development of the Aboriginal Cultural Centre and Museum in Whistler BC.

The purchase of a Tree Farm Licence by the Nation generated public protest.

In recent years the Squamish Nation has been involved in energy development, including the development of private hydro power projects on public rivers, including the Furry Creek and Ashlu hydro projects. It takes a share of the private revenue scheme developed by the BC Liberal Government under Gordon Campbell in a closed-door policy called the BC Energy Plan.

2010 Olympic Games
The Squamish Nation joined with the Musqueam, Tsleil-Waututh, and Lil'wat through the Four Host First Nations Society to coordinate with the Vancouver Organizing Committee (VANOC), representing their interests in preparation for the 2010 Winter Olympics. These 'Four Host First Nations' shared in hosting the 2010 Olympic Games in Vancouver. Fourteen of the 20 Olympic and Paralympic events took place in the Nation's shared territories, primarily in and around Whistler, BC.

Social, educational and cultural programs and facilities 
In July 2008, the Squamish Nation partnered with their neighbours the Lil'wat First Nation to open the multimillion-dollar Squamish Lilwat Cultural Centre in Whistler. The two nations, whose territories traditionally overlapped around the Whistler area, had signed a Protocol Agreement in 2001 to work together on such opportunities. The centre features traditional art, cultural and historical displays, wood carvings, an 80-seat theatre, longhouse, pit-house, outdoor forest walk, cafe and gift shop.

See also
 Squamish people
 Joe Capilano
 Squamish language
 Tsleil-Waututh First Nation
 History of Squamish and Tsleil-Waututh longshoremen, 1863-1963

References

External links
Squamish Nation
Squamish Lilwat Cultural Centre

Nation
Coast Salish governments